Redscale is a technique of shooting photographic film where the film is exposed from the wrong side, i.e. the emulsion is exposed through the base of the film. Normally, this is done by winding the film upside-down into an empty film canister. The name "redscale" comes because there is a strong color shift to red due to the red-sensitive layer of the film being exposed first, rather than last [the red layer is normally the bottom layer in C-41 (color print) film]. All layers are sensitive to blue light, so normally the blue layer is on top, followed by a filter. In this technique, blue light exposes the layers containing cyan and magenta dyes, but the layer containing yellow dye is left unexposed due to the filter. E-6 (color slide) film has also been used for this technique.

Depending on the type of film used, the resulting colors range from maroon, to red, to orange, to yellow.

The technique seems to have been discovered accidentally. Some people shooting large format color film would load the individual negatives backwards. This phenomenon is likely as old as color film itself. However, it has only recently gained popularity as an effect intentionally sought.

The technique is considered by some to be part of the lo-fi photography movement, along with use of toy cameras, pinhole cameras, instant cameras, and sprocket hole photography.

The Lomographic Society International has produced a pre-loaded redscale film for 35mm cameras. Because of the nature of the film, shots need to be over exposed by one to three stops to achieve correct exposure on developing.

The amount of over exposure determines the intensity of the red. When redscale film is shot at the posted ASA the resulting photos are almost all red, over exposure allows light to reach the less sensitive green and blue layers of the film. Exposures of 5 stops or more over posted speed can result in the red layer washing out completely and the resulting images appearing mostly yellow.

See also 
 Cross processing

External links 

 Instructions on how to make redscale film
 Redscale Technique
 Flickr 'redscale' group - examples and discussion
 Make Your Own RedScale Pinhole Camera
 An introduction to Redscale film
 Recreate the Redscale film effect in Photoshop

Photographic processes
Photographic techniques